Styopin (masculine), Styopina (feninine), also when diacritics are ignored during transliteration:   Stepin (masculine), Stepina (feninine) is a Russian language surname derived from the given name Styopa, a diminutive from Stepan. Notable people with the surname include:

Aleksandr Stepin
Anatoly Styopin
Vita Styopina

See also
Stepin (disambiguation)